Carlisle is a city in Warren and Polk counties in the U.S. state of Iowa. The population was 4,160 at the 2020 census. The city is part of the Des Moines–West Des Moines Metropolitan Statistical Area.

The city received considerable media attention in 1997 when Carlisle residents Kenny and Bobbi McCaughey (pronounced "McCoy") became the parents of the world's first surviving set of septuplets.

History 
Carlisle was laid out in 1851. It is named from Carlisle, Pennsylvania. The town experienced growth in 1871 when the railroad was built through it.

Geography
Carlisle is located at  (41.501203, -93.490351), between the North and Middle Rivers, near their confluences with the Des Moines River.

The Summerset Trail has its northern terminus at Carlisle.

Demographics

2010 census
As of the census of 2010, there were 3,876 people, 1,474 households, and 1,056 families living in the city. The racial makeup of the city was 96.7% White, 0.4% African American, 0.1% Native American, 0.5% Asian, 0.5% from other races, and 1.9% from two or more races. Hispanic or Latino of any race were 2.0% of the population.

There were 1,474 households, of which 39.6% had children under the age of 18 living with them, 53.7% were married couples living together, 12.4% had a female householder with no husband present, 5.5% had a male householder with no wife present, and 28.4% were non-families. 23.7% of all households were made up of individuals, and 9.3% had someone living alone who was 65 years of age or older. The average household size was 2.57 and the average family size was 3.05.

The median age in the city was 37.5 years. 28.9% of residents were under the age of 18; 6.7% were between the ages of 18 and 24; 25.5% were from 25 to 44; 24.2% were from 45 to 64; and 14.7% were 65 years of age or older. The gender makeup of the city was 48.2% male and 51.8% female.

2000 census
As of the census of 2000, there were 3,497 people, 1,338 households, and 974 families living in the city. The racial makeup of the city was 98.06% White, 0.17% African American, 0.34% Native American, 0.20% Asian, 0.06% Pacific Islander, 0.49% from other races, and 0.69% from two or more races. Hispanic or Latino of any race were 1.14% of the population.

There were 1,338 households, out of which 38.0% had children under the age of 18 living with them, 59.0% were married couples living together, 11.1% had a female householder with no husband present, and 27.2% were non-families. 23.1% of all households were made up of individuals, and 9.7% had someone living alone who was 65 years of age or older. The average household size was 2.54 and the average family size was 3.01.

27.6% are under the age of 18, 8.0% from 18 to 24, 28.3% from 25 to 44, 22.5% from 45 to 64, and 13.6% who were 65 years of age or older. The median age was 35 years. For every 100 females, there were 89.1 males. For every 100 females age 18 and over, there were 84.5 males.

The median income for a household in the city was $47,528, and the median income for a family was $53,924. Males had a median income of $39,286 versus $26,162 for females. The per capita income for the city was $19,467. About 2.8% of families and 3.3% of the population were below the poverty line, including 2.5% of those under age 18 and 9.4% of those age 65 or over.

Education 
Carlisle Community Schools operates public schools in Carlisle.

The district maintains an upper elementary campus in Hartford and a high school/elementary school campus in Carlisle.  A middle school campus was developed with a major residential and commercial development along Scotch Ridge Road.

References

External links

 
The Carlisle Citizen - Local newspaper
City of Carlisle
Carlisle Chamber of Commerce

Cities in Iowa
Cities in Polk County, Iowa
Cities in Warren County, Iowa
Des Moines metropolitan area
Populated places established in 1851
1851 establishments in Iowa